ZiS-5 may refer to:

 F-34 tank gun, used on the T-34 tank
 ZiS-5 (truck), produced at Zavod imeni Stalina; see also ZiS-6